The Silent Call is a 1921 American silent adventure film directed by Laurence Trimble and featuring John Bowers, Kathryn McGuire and William Dyer. It was produced as a vehicle for the canine star Strongheart who appeared in several silent films.

Cast
 Strongheart the Dog as 	Flash
 John Bowers as 	Clark Moran
 Kathryn McGuire as Betty Houston
 William Dyer as 	Ash Brent
 Jim Mason as Luther Nash 
 Nelson McDowell as 	Dad Kinney
 Ed Brady as Jimmy the Dud 
 Robert Bolder as 	James Houston

References

Bibliography
 Connelly, Robert B. The Silents: Silent Feature Films, 1910-36, Volume 40, Issue 2. December Press, 1998.

External links
 

1920s American films
1921 films
1921 adventure films
1920s English-language films
American silent feature films
American adventure films
American black-and-white films
Films directed by Laurence Trimble
First National Pictures films
Silent adventure films